A by-election for the seat of Willoughby in the New South Wales Legislative Assembly was held on 30 November 1894 because Joseph Cullen was forced to resign because he was bankrupt.

Dates

Result

Joseph Cullen resigned due to bankruptcy.

See also
Electoral results for the district of Willoughby
List of New South Wales state by-elections

Notes

References

1894 elections in Australia
New South Wales state by-elections
1890s in New South Wales